Johanna Tukiainen (born 29 July 1978) is a Finnish former television personality and singer.

In media

Background
Tukiainen first became known in March 2008 with news report that Finland's foreign minister Ilkka Kanerva had been sending her sexually suggestive text messages. Tukiainen then sold the messages to a tabloid magazine Hymy. Kanerva insisted he would stay in his job but had to resign due to pressure from his own party National Coalition Party.

In 2012, Tukiainen was mentioned again in news reports when she reportedly urinated publicly on a platform of Tampere main railway station. Ever since these incidents, Tukiainen has been featured heavily in the headlines of the Finnish tabloid press.

Tukiainen has been convicted of several criminal offenses including multiple assaults and drunk driving in 2011. In May 2013 she was sentenced to two months in prison for assault and in September to 45 days more also for assault.

Tukiainen has also gained a lot of debt. According to the official records she owes to various creditors an amount close to €60,000.

Tukiainen lived in Loviisa, Finland during summer 2018 but moved back to Helsinki during the fall. She has been doing singing and dancing focused shows at bars and other such establishments across Finland. But has lately reclaimed her status as a Christian and has talked at Christian meetings.

In 2020, Tukiainen lived in Sweden with her domestic partner with whom she has a daughter born in 2020.

In August 2022, Tukiainen lost the custody of her daughter due to Swedish social services having worried about her ability to care for her daughter. Upon the loss of custody, Tukiainen took the child abroad, thus breaking the court decision, and was later found in Bordeaux, France where she was apprehended and the child taken into custody. Tukiainen was charged with child abduction.

Family
Johanna's sister, Julia Tukiainen (born 1983), was found deceased in their apartment on 17 December 2013. Julia had been diagnosed with diabetes type 1 in her recent years.

Her sister Jasmine Tukiainen died in 2021.

References 

1978 births
Singers from Helsinki
Finnish female models
Finnish pop singers
Living people
21st-century Finnish singers
Finnish Christians
Finnish expatriates in Sweden